Meta is an unincorporated community in Pike County, Kentucky. The community had a post office from 1896 to 1959.

Climate
The climate in this area is characterized by hot, humid summers and generally mild to cool winters.  According to the Köppen Climate Classification system, Meta has a humid subtropical climate, abbreviated "Cfa" on climate maps.

References

Unincorporated communities in Pike County, Kentucky
Unincorporated communities in Kentucky